Menlo-Atherton High School (known as M-A to locals) is a four-year public high school secondary school located in Atherton, California.  Menlo-Atherton is part of the Sequoia Union High School District.

Menlo-Atherton has been named one of the top secondary schools in the nation by the United States Department of Education as part of its National School Recognition Program.  It was selected as a California Distinguished School by the California Department of Education in 2007 and 2013. In 2005, Newsweek ranked the school as the 259th best school in the United States. Menlo-Atherton also offers the most Advanced Placement courses in the district with over twenty, ranging from Studio Art to US History.

Since the closure of Ravenswood High School, Menlo-Atherton has been racially diverse, drawing from Atherton, Menlo Park, Redwood City, East Palo Alto, and Portola Valley. The school's motto is "Strength in Diversity".

Academics
Typically, 97% of graduates continue their education. 37% opt for two-year colleges, 60% go to four-year colleges.

M-A offers the following Advanced Placement courses: Art History; Biology; Calculus AB/BC; Chinese Language; Chemistry; Computer Science; English Language/Composition; English Literature; Environmental Science; European History; French Language; Latin; Physics; Psychology; Spanish Language; Spanish Literature (approximately every other year); Statistics; Studio Art; and US History. M-A has an 84% pass rate on AP exams, with just under 40% scoring a 5. It also has the Advanced Via Individual Determination program and the Computer Academy, programs for students seeking a smaller, supportive learning environment.

Athletics
Menlo-Atherton has nearly 60 teams at the varsity, junior varsity and freshman levels in 15 sports that they offer. Over 46% of the student body participates in a sport with 1,100 athletes in the 2018-19 season. M-A has emerged as one of the most accomplished athletic programs in Northern California, winning 2 CIF State titles (Football & Girls Wrestling-individual title), 8 Central Coast Section titles, and 13 Peninsula Athletic League titles in the 2018-19 school year. The Bears have also won the PAL Commissioner's Cup the last 11 years in a row and in 12 of the 13 years of its existence. The Commissioner's Cup is awarded annually to the Peninsula Athletic League school that best exemplifies the league's commitment to sportsmanship and excellence in athletics. Points are awarded to each varsity team in each sport that they participate in, by the order of finish in league play and for sportsmanship.

In 2017, Co-Athletic Directors Paul Snow and Steven Kryger were named NorCal Athletic Directors of the Year by the California Coaches Association. That same year saw Adhir Ravipati named the NorCal Football Coach of the Year, and in 2018, Jane Worden and Brett Koerten were named State Swim Coaches of the Year, also by the California Coaches Association. In 2017, Menlo-Atherton was named the Northern California Public High School of the Year by Prep2Prep.com for their athletic achievements.

Fine arts
Menlo-Atherton is home to a professional-level 492-seat theater, the Menlo-Atherton Center for Performing Arts. It is home to the school play and musical; band, orchestra, guitar, and choir concerts; the Menlo-Atherton Student Film Festival; the Bear Arts Expo, a collaboration between all of M-A's arts classes; and many other school events. It also hosts events related to the City of Menlo Park, which partially financed its construction, and is a regular venue of ensembles and music festivals including the Philharmonia Baroque Orchestra and Music@Menlo.

The Advanced Jazz Ensemble regularly travels to festivals around the world, including the annual Reno Jazz Festival and the Montreux Jazz Festival.  The band is supported by the Band Boosters.

The Center is home to M-A Drama, Menlo-Atherton's chapter of the International Thespian Society. M-A Drama produces a play and a musical each year.  M-A Drama is supported by M-A Drama Boosters.

Alumni

 Rebecca Bauer-Kahan, California State Legislator
 Chuck Bradley, American football player
 Greg Buckingham, Olympic Silver Medalist in swimming; brother of Lindsey
 Lindsey Buckingham, singer and guitarist with rock group Fleetwood Mac
Cheryl Burke, Professional dancer on Dancing with the Stars
 Greg Camarillo (born 1982), NFL wide receiver (Minnesota Vikings)
 Chris Dorst, Olympic silver medalist in water polo, Los Angeles 1984
 Marshall "Mark" Drummond, academic administrator
 James Gaughran, Olympic water polo athlete, Melbourne 1956
 Scott Huffaker, American racing driver
Mark Lettieri, Grammy award winning guitarist with Snarky Puppy
 Bob Melvin (born 1961), Major League Baseball player and manager, current manager of the San Diego Padres
 Stevie Nicks, singer with rock group Fleetwood Mac
 Elizabeth Osborn, woman equestrian vaulter United States, 2008
Ruth Porat, Alphabet and Google CFO; former Morgan Stanley CFO
Jamila Reinhardt, current player on the USA Rugby women's national team, named in the Eagles 2017 Women's Rugby World Cup squad.
 Dick Roth, Olympic gold medalist in swimming, Tokyo 1964, Olympic and world record holder 400IM
 Courtney Thorne-Smith, actress
 Rhett Ayers Butler, Journalist and Author
 Bob Weir, singer, guitarist and founding member of The Grateful Dead
 Steve Westly, venture capitalist, former California State Controller, 2006 gubernatorial candidate, and executive at eBay
 Richard L. Wright, political leader

Faculty

Leo Krupnik (born 1979), Ukrainian-born American-Israeli former soccer player and current soccer coach.

See also

San Mateo County High Schools

References

External links
Menlo-Atherton High School website

Educational institutions established in 1951
High schools in San Mateo County, California
Public high schools in California
1951 establishments in California